The bifurcated needle is a narrow steel rod, approximately  long with two prongs at one end. It was designed to hold one dose of reconstituted freeze-dried smallpox vaccine between its prongs. Up to one hundred vaccinations can be given from one vial of the reconstituted vaccine. The established technique for smallpox vaccination is to dip the needle in the vaccine, and then perpendicularly puncture a person's upper arm fifteen times rapidly in a small circular area, without prior cleansing of the skin with alcohol. The punctures should remain in an area approximately 5 mm in diameter. The needle is then disposed of. When done correctly a trace of blood appears at the vaccination site within 10 to 20 seconds after the procedure.

The bifurcated needle was created as a more efficient and cost effective alternative to the jet injector previously in use. It was invented in 1965 by Dr. Benjamin Rubin, working at Wyeth Laboratories, and was the primary instrument used during the World Health Organization's 1966–1977 campaign to eradicate smallpox. Rubin estimated that it was used to administer 200 million vaccinations per year during the final years of the campaign.

After the September 11, 2001 attacks and subsequent anthrax scares, the US government ordered the smallpox vaccine be available for every person in the country. Precision Medical Products, Inc. was awarded the contract to make the bifurcated needles to go along with the vaccine and made over 400,000,000 of these needles in a two year span. Roechling Medical Lancaster, LLC, which purchased Precision Medical Products in 2018, remains the world's primary supplier of bifurcated needles.

References

Drug delivery devices
Smallpox eradication
Smallpox vaccines